Carl Barks (1901–2000) was an American illustrator and comic book creator. The quality of his scripts and drawings earned him the nicknames The Duck Man and The Good Duck Artist.

He is mainly known for his work with Disney characters. But during his time with Western Publishing he also wrote and/or drew 36 stories with characters, that didn't belong to Disney.

List of stories 
Only the Porky Pig story had a title in the original publication. Stories 1–7 & 9–33 have been reprinted in Barks Bear Book with the shown titles. All titles can be found on Barksbase.de. Different titles can be found on Grand Comics Database. The numbers in the reprint column are from the reprint list.

Sources

Original publication 
 NF: New Funnies #76, June 1943
 OGC: Our Gang Comics #8, Nov.-Dec. 1943 — #36, July 1947
 FCC: Four Color Comics #48, July 1944
 T&JWC: Tom & Jerry Winter carnival #1, Dec. 1952 — #2, Dec. 1953
 T&JSF: Tom & Jerry Summer Fun #1, July 1954

Reprints in English 
Reprints in chronological order:
 Tom & Jerry Summer Fun, 1967: Gold Key
 Golden Comics Digest #22, Mar 1972: Gold Key
 Golden Comics Digest #41, Jan 1975: Gold Key
 Barks Bear Book, 1979: Editions Enfin
 Bugs Bunny and friends – A comic celebration, 1998: DC Comics, 
 The Carl Barks' Big Book of Barney Bear. 2011: IDW Publishing, 
 The Carl Barks Fan Club Pictorial Volume Four, 2014: CreateSpace Independent Publishing Platform, 
 The Carl Barks Fan Club Pictorial Volume Five, 2015: CreateSpace Independent Publishing Platform, 
 The Carl Barks Fan Club Pictorial Volume Six, 2015: CreateSpace Independent Publishing Platform, 
 The Unavailable Carl Barks (in color), 2016: CreateSpace Independent Publishing Platform, 
 Restoring Carl Barks, 2018: CreateSpace Independent Publishing Platform, 
 The Carl Barks Library of Burros, Hounds, Bears, Pigs, and Bunnies, 2019: CreateSpace Independent Publishing Platform,

Other sources 
 Carl Barks and the Art of the Comic Books, 1982: M Lilien, 
 Four Color Comics #48 on Grand Comics Database
 New Funnies #76 on Grand Comics Database
 New Funnies #76 on Barksbase.de
 Our Gang Comics #8–36 on Barksbase.de
 Tom and Jerry Winter Carnival #1–2 on Barksbase.de
 Tom and Jerry Summer Fun #1 on Barksbase.de

Further information 
 Barks' non-Disney stories on Cbarks.dk
 Barks Bear Book on Seriesam.com
 Our Gang Comics on Grand Comics Database
 Tom & Jerry Winter Carnival on Grand Comics Database
 Tom & Jerry Summer Fun on Grand Comics Database
 Tom & Jerry Summer Fun (1967 reprint) on Grand Comics Database
 Golden Comics Digest (1971 & 1975 reprint) on Grand Comics Database

Barks, Carl
Comics by Carl Barks